William James Gilbert Allen (born August 12, 1946) is a former political figure in Saskatchewan, Canada. He represented Regina Rosemont from 1975 to 1982 in the Legislative Assembly of Saskatchewan as a New Democratic Party (NDP) member.

He was born in Regina, Saskatchewan, the son of Alfred B. Allen and Delores M. Holmes, and was educated there, at St. Peter's College and at the University of Saskatchewan. Allen was defeated by Gordon Dirks when he ran for reelection to the Saskatchewan assembly in 1982.

References 

1946 births
Living people
Politicians from Regina, Saskatchewan
Saskatchewan New Democratic Party MLAs